The 1964 Syracuse Orangemen football team represented Syracuse University in the 1964 NCAA University Division football season. The Orangemen were led by 16th-year head coach Ben Schwartzwalder and played their home games at Archbold Stadium in Syracuse, New York. Syracuse finished the regular season with a record of 7–3 and ranked 12th in the Coaches' Poll. They were 
invited to the Sugar Bowl, where they lost to LSU.

Schedule

References

Syracuse
Syracuse Orange football seasons
Syracuse Orangemen football